Julio Ceja may refer to:

 Julio Ceja (boxer) (born 1992), Mexican boxer
 Julio Ceja (footballer) (born 1986), Mexican footballer